The Spy Gone North is a 2018 South Korean spy drama film directed by Yoon Jong-bin. It stars Hwang Jung-min, Lee Sung-min, Cho Jin-woong and Ju Ji-hoon. The film is loosely based on the true story of Park Chae-seo, a former South Korean agent who infiltrated North Korea's nuclear facilities. The film was released in theaters on August 8, 2018.

Plot
The story follows a South Korean spy who infiltrates the North to obtain intelligence on the country's nuclear-weapons plans in the mid-1990s
only to find his own side is manipulating his country's political elections with the help of the North.

Cast
Hwang Jung-min as Park Seok-young (codename Black Venus)
Lee Sung-min as Ri Myung-woon
Cho Jin-woong as Choi Hak-sung
Ju Ji-hoon as State Security Department Head Jung
Joo Hae-eun as North Korean agent	
Gi Ju-bong as Kim Jong-Il
Kim Hyun as Real estate office owner
Kim So-jin as Han Chang-joo's wife
Park Min-su as Ri Myung-woon's son
Lee Hyori as herself (cameo)

Production
Filming began on January 24, 2017 and concluded on July 25, 2017. Some parts of the film that are set in Beijing and North Korea were filmed in Taiwan.

Release
The film made its world premiere in 2018 Cannes Film Festival. It released theatrically in South Korea on August 8, 2018, with age 12-rating. The film was sold to more than 100 countries, and was released theatrically in North America on August 17, 2018.

The Spy Gone North was released on VOD by CJ E&M on September 13, 2018.

Reception

Critical response
On Metacritic, the film received average score 69 out of 100 based 6 reviews, indicating "generally favorable reviews".

Charles Bramesco of The Guardian rated the film 3 out of 5 and said, "Yoon [Jong-bin] executes all the classic double-agent set pieces with finesse, and those enamoured of the genre will appreciate a change of setting."

Maggie Lee of the Variety wrote, "Instead of the usual dose of action and suspense one expects of this genre, watching this dense 140-minute political drama unfold is like fumbling through a long tunnel that’s nonetheless worth it when the ray of light emerges at the end."

Deborah Young of The Hollywood Reporter said the film "is a stylish, blood-pounding thriller of the type Asian cinema is so good at making...For sheer topicality, the film is hard to beat, and to find a full-blown entertainment yarn in Cannes' midnight section that's partially set in newsworthy North Korea is rather astounding."

Box office
The film finished second during its opening week behind Along with the Gods: The Last 49 Days, with  gross over five days screening (Wednesday to Sunday). After finishing second for two consecutive weekends, the film placed third during its third weekend, behind On Your Wedding Day and The Witness. It had a 59% drop in gross, earning  from 317,447 attendance.

On August 28, 2018, the film reached its break-even point with 4.7 million audience members having watched the film. During its fourth weekend, the film had a 74% drop in gross compared to its third weekend, finishing at seventh place with 86,336 attendance. The film stable on seventh place during its fifth weekend.

As of September 24, 2018, the film grossed  from 4,970,004 total attendance.

Awards and nominations

References

External links
 
 
 The Spy Gone North on Rotten Tomatoes
 

2018 films
2018 action thriller films
2010s spy films
South Korean spy films
South Korean action thriller films
Films directed by Yoon Jong-bin
CJ Entertainment films
Films about the National Intelligence Service (South Korea)
Cultural depictions of Kim Jong-il
Films set in North Korea
2010s South Korean films